Business Center is a primetime a business news television program that was broadcast on CNBC Asia.  It debuted in October 2000 to replace the Asian Edition of Global Market Watch.  The program took its name from CNBC United States' flagship evening show, Business Center and while it shared the same lower-thirds, the background for the charts remained the same as the ones used during other daytime shows. It was initially presented by Martin Soong and Grace Phan. Regular contributors to the show included Maria Bartiromo (CNBC US) and Nick Hastings (Dow Jones Newswires).  Various reporters from CNBC Europe also gave updates on the European trading day. The show was ultimately replaced in February 2005 by CNBC Tonight.

Overview
The program reviewed all the action from the Asian trading day, crossed-over to Europe to see the midday action there and previewed the session in the United States.  It also featured updates and analysis of the currency markets from Dow Jones Newswires.  World news updates are also featured and the show ends by telling viewers the business events or the kinds of economic data across the region scheduled to be released the following day.

See also
Business Center (U.S.)
Business Centre Australia
Business Centre Europe

2000 Singaporean television series debuts
2005 Singaporean television series endings
Business-related television series
CNBC Asia original programming
Television news shows